This is a list of Lithuanian actors of film, television and theatre who originated from Lithuania.

A
 Regimantas Adomaitis (born 1937)

B

 Unė Babickaitė (1897–1961)
 Donatas Banionis (1924–2014)
 Artūras Barysas (1954–2005)
 Vytautas Pranas Bičiūnas (1893–1943)

 Cornell Borchers (1925–2014)
 Lina Braknytė (born 1952)
 Juozas Budraitis (born 1940)

D
 Ingeborga Dapkūnaitė (born 1963)
 Agnia Ditkovskyte (born 1988)

H
 Laurence Harvey (1928–1973)

J

 Inga Jankauskaitė (born 1981)

 Jurgita Jurkutė (born 1985)

K

 Rolandas Kazlas (born 1969)

 Vytautas Kernagis (1951–2008)

M

 Andrius Mamontovas (born 1967)
 Algimantas Masiulis (1931–2008)

 Aurelija Mikušauskaitė (1937–1974)
 Juozas Miltinis (1907–1994)
 Saulius Mykolaitis (1966–2006)

O

 Kristina Orbakaite (born 1971)

 Nijolė Oželytė-Vaitiekūnienė (born 1954)

R
 Živilė Raudonienė (born 1982)

S
 Vytautas Šapranauskas (1958–2013)
 Jacques Sernas (1925–2015)
 Antanas Škėma (1910–1961)

V

 Rimantė Valiukaitė (born 1970)
 Adolfas Večerskis (born 1949)
 Bria Vinaite (born Barbora Bulvinaitė in 1993))

See also

List of Lithuanians

Lithuanian
Actors